La Manga Club is a sports and leisure resort located in the south-eastern region of Spain, Murcia, south of La Manga, and bordered by the Mar Menor and Calblanque Regional Park. The resort complex opened in 1972 and covers an area of 1,400 acres (560 ha).

La Manga Club - The Resort, in fact resides within an area called Atamaria, and provides sporting services to an established and growing "Small Town" - The La Manga Club Community - LMCC. It comprises over 2,200 privately owned homes with growing resident population. Within LMCC there is a Church - St Teresa's, a Post Office and local Bank offices.

Resort facilities
Resort facilities include the Hotel Príncipe Felipe apartment hotel, three golf courses, 28 tennis courts, and eight football pitches, including the La Manga Club Ground and the La Manga Club Football Stadium. The resort has hosted the England national football team for pre-season training, the Spanish Open, and tennis tournaments including the Davis Cup and the Fed Cup.

La Manga Club Ground

La Manga Club Ground is a multi purpose stadium in La Manga Club. The ground is mainly used for organizing matches of football, cricket and other sports. The ground has yet to host first-class match but it has become premier cricket ground in Spain.

International cricket
In April 2016, it was announced that Ireland's 2016 Inter-Provincial Trophy will be held at La Manga Club Ground.

La Manga Club hosted its first Twenty20 International (T20I) during 2019 Spain Triangular T20I Series. On 29 March 2019, Awais Ahmed of Spain scored first international century at the venue.

In August 2021 the club hosted ten Women's Twenty20 Internationals for the 2021 ICC Women's T20 World Cup Europe Qualifier

International centuries
Two T20I centuries and two Women's T20I centuries have been scored at the venue.

Twenty20 International centuries

Women's Twenty20 International centuries

Real Golf La Manga Club

La Manga Club has three 18-hole golf courses, North, South and West Courses. In 2017 the golf club was named Real Golf La Manga Club by The Royal Household of Spain. It has hosted bot the Open de España (Men's Spanish Open), Open de España Femenino (Women's Spanish Open), the Spanish International Amateur Championship (Copa S.M. el Rey) and the Spanish Senior Open for men.

La Manga Club Football Stadium

The La Manga Club Football Stadium is a resort stadium that was used to friendly matches and as a resting and training place for the Spain national football team.

Incidents
In 2015, the body of British diver Neil Anthony Fears was discovered near a popular diving attraction in the resort, after he lost contact with three other divers during a dive.

See also
 La Manga Stadium
 List of golf clubs granted Royal status

References

External links

 Official website
 Owners Handbook - History of La Manga Club
 La Manga Club Top Ground
 La Manga Club Bottom Ground

Sport in the Region of Murcia
Sports venues in the Region of Murcia
Resorts in Spain
Football venues in the Region of Murcia
Cricket grounds in Spain
Cricket in Spain